Azima sarmentosa is a species of plant in the Salvadoraceae family. It is found in Cambodia, Malaysia, Myanmar, the Philippines, and Vietnam.

References

Salvadoraceae
Least concern plants
Taxonomy articles created by Polbot